Apurva Anand (born 28 December 1999) is an Indian cricketer. He made his List A debut on 26 February 2021, for Bihar in the 2020–21 Vijay Hazare Trophy.

References

External links
 

1999 births
Living people
Indian cricketers
Bihar cricketers